Thulhaadhoo (Dhivehi: ތުޅާދޫ) is one of the inhabited islands of Baa Atoll.

History

The island has been reclaimed by the government recently. The island is famous for its lacquer work. It used to supply the noble families in the country with lacquered items, but now most of Thulhaadhoo's lacquer work is sold to tourists as sounveirs.

Geography

Demography

Governance

Thulhaadhoo Council

The island is administered by a council of five members. The current council was inaugurated in 2010. The main objectives of this council are to make sure the well being of the island's citizens and to provide the basic needs of the people. The council is seen very active in the development of the island, although critics have risen against it.

Umaira Aboobakr, who is the only Dhivehi Rayyithunge Party (DRP) member in the council, which holds the majority of Maldivian Democratic Party (MDP) with its four members, is faced with major difficulties working with the council. The disputes within the council reached its peak, when the four MDP members took a vote in the middle of 2011 to sack Umaira claiming that "she had not attended seven council meetings in a row." A by-election was announced by the Elections Commission  of the Maldives but, later that year, The Maldivian High-Court cancelled the election and said that "the announcement on 5 October 2011 by Elections Commission for by-elections of B. Thulhaadhoo to be held on 19 November 2011, was made without fulfilling the requirements previously ordered by the High Court".

Education
The island has one school headed by principal Ahmed Abdhulla. In the year 2019 Ahmed Abdulla resigned from the post. There are two pre schools in Thulhaadhoo.

Healthcare
Thulhaadhoo's Health Centre became famous when Dr. Muhammad Owais Aziz recorded the first case of swine flu in Maldives.

References

Islands of the Maldives